Loose lips sink ships is an American English idiom meaning "beware of unguarded talk". The phrase originated on propaganda posters during World War II. The phrase was created by the War Advertising Council and used on posters by the United States Office of War Information.

This type of poster was part of a general campaign to advise servicemen and other citizens to avoid careless talk that might undermine the war effort. 
There were many similar such slogans, but "Loose lips sink ships" remained in the American idiom for the remainder of the century and into the next, usually as an admonition to avoid careless talk in general. (The British equivalent used "Careless Talk Costs Lives", and variations on the phrase "Keep mum", while in neutral Sweden the State Information Board promoted the wordplay "En svensk tiger" ("A Swedish tiger" or "A Swede keeps silent": the Swedish word "tiger" means both "tiger" and "keeps silent"), and Germany used "Schäm Dich, Schwätzer!".

However, propaganda experts at the time and historians since have argued the main goal of these and similar posters was to actually frighten people into not spreading rumors – or truths – containing bad news that might hurt morale or create tension between groups of Americans, since the Federal Bureau of Investigation (in charge of dealing with enemy spies) had rounded up the key agents in June 1941, so that the nation "entered the war with confidence that there was no major German espionage network hidden in U.S. society."  From the White House's perspective, the FBI had succeeded in virtually ending the German espionage threat. Historian Joseph E. Persico says it "practically shut down German espionage in the United States overnight."  

Historian D'Ann Campbell argues that the purpose of the wartime posters, propaganda, and censorship of soldiers' letters was not to foil spies but "to clamp as tight a lid as possible on rumors that might lead to discouragement, frustration, strikes, or anything that would cut back military production."

See also
 Andrew J. May#The May Incident
 Operations security
 Loose Lips (disambiguation) (usually an anapodoton (shortening) of the full phrase "Loose lips sink ships")

References

American English idioms
American propaganda during World War II
Classified information in the United States
World War II propaganda
Quotations from military
Slogans
1940s neologisms